Hood Related is a studio album released on October 28, 1997 by the Washington, D.C.-based go-go band BackYard Band.

Track listing

Disc 1
"Intro" – 2:36
"91 Dope Jam" – 8:58
"Gingus Live" – 1:38
"Hood Stars" – 4:06
"Friday Nite Fish Fry" – 3:22
"Cease Fire" – 8:44
"Gingus Live" – 1:30
"Reggae in the Yard" – 7:01
"Ms. Poet" – 1:38
"Ill Na Na" – 5:10
"Big G and Jas. Funk" – 8:59
"Junk in the Trunk" – 13:01
"Rock & Roll" – 2:03

Disc 2
"Bob and Mike" – 1:07
"Pimp Talk 2000" – 2:22
"Freestyle" – 12:01
"Slow Shit" – 2:26
"Definition of Unibomber" – 1:14
"Unibomber 97" – 8:33
"Back in the Day" – 3:36
"We Just Sippin" – 9:30
"Gingus Live" – 1:23
"Outstanding" – 4:37
"Tap, Tap" – 12:09
"John Salley" – 6:18
"Listen" – 2:19
"Black and Gifted" – 2:17

Personnel
Adapted from AllMusic.
Bruce (Joey from Rock) – producer, vocals
Bubba (Italian Stallion) – electric guitar
Carlos (Little Los) – vocals
Eric – keyboards
Gingus (Big G) – vocals
Keith (Hot Sauce) – congas, percussion, rototoms
Leroy (Unc) – bass guitar
Mike (Whitehead Mike) – keyboards, producer
Paul (Buggie) – drums, percussion
Michelle Precise – vocals
Stephanie Rhodes – vocals
Weensey– vocals

References

External links
Hood Related at Discogs

1997 albums
Go-go albums